The Roman Catholic Diocese of Istmina–Tadó is a diocese located in the cities of Istmina and Tadó in the Ecclesiastical province of Santa Fe de Antioquia in Colombia.

History
14 November 1952: Established as Diocese of Istmina from the Apostolic Prefecture of Chocó
30 April 1990: Renamed as Diocese of Istmina – Tadó

Bishops

Ordinaries
 Bishop of Istmina 
Gustavo Posada Peláez, M.X.Y. (24 Mar 1953 – 30 Apr 1990), appointed Bishop of Istmina–Tadó (see below)
 Bishops of Istmina–Tadó
Gustavo Posada Peláez, M.X.Y. (30 Apr 1990 – 5 May 1993)
Alonso Llano Ruiz (5 May 1993 – 5 Jun 2010)
Julio Hernando García Peláez (5 Jun 2010 – 15 Jun 2017), appointed Bishop of Garagoa
Mario de Jesús Álvarez Gómez (3 Feb 2018–present)

Other priests of this diocese who became bishops
Luis Madrid Merlano, appointed Prelate of Tibú in 1988
Jorge Alberto Ossa Soto, appointed Bishop of Florencia in 2003

See also
Roman Catholicism in Colombia

Sources

External links
 GCatholic.org

Roman Catholic dioceses in Colombia
Roman Catholic Ecclesiastical Province of Santa Fe de Antioquia
Christian organizations established in 1952
Roman Catholic dioceses and prelatures established in the 20th century
1952 establishments in Colombia